The Jazak Monastery is a Serb Orthodox monastery on the Fruška Gora mountain in the northern Serbia, in the province of Vojvodina. The monastery was founded in 1736. The icons on the baroque iconostasis were painted in 1769 by Dimitrije Bačević and the carved woodwork was attributed to engraver Marko Vujatović. An overall reconstruction of the monastery was carried out from 1926 to 1930.

Jazak Monastery was declared Monument of Culture of Exceptional Importance in 1990, and it is protected by Serbia.

Burials
Stefan Uroš V

See also
Monasteries of Fruška Gora
Cultural Monuments of Exceptional Importance
Tourism in Serbia
List of Serbian Orthodox monasteries

References

External links 

Jazak Monastery - Fruškać
More about the monastery

Cultural Monuments of Exceptional Importance (Serbia)
Serbian Orthodox monasteries in Serbia
1736 establishments in Europe
Religious organizations established in the 1730s
Christian monasteries established in the 18th century